Charles W. “Stormy” Bidwill, Jr. (born June 9, 1928) is an American businessman and was the president of the now defunct Sportsman’s Park horse track in Cicero, Illinois from 1967-1995 and co-owner of the St. Louis Cardinals with his brother Bill Bidwill from 1962-1972.

Early life and education
Charles Jr. and his younger brother Bill were adopted by Charles and Violet Bidwill owners of the then-Chicago Cardinals. Bidwill attended Georgetown University where he obtained a law degree. He was given the nickname “Stormy” when he was one year old after an uncle observed him having a temper tantrum.

Football and horse racing
Prior to the 1960 season, Violet Bidwill moved the Cardinals to St. Louis, Missouri and Charles Jr. and Bill inherited the team after their mother’s sudden death in 1962. In addition to the football team, the brothers inherited other business interests including Sportsman’s Park. Charles Jr. was named president of Sportsman's Park in 1967 and remained in Chicago to run the horse track while his brother Bill lived in St. Louis and essentially ran the football team. Over the years, their relationship became strained and in 1972, Charles Jr. sold his share of the team to Bill for $6,500,000.

Other business interests

Along with Sportsman’s Park, Bidwill owned a beer distributorship and had financial interests in four Florida dog tracks. For many years, he was the largest stockholder in Churchill Downs and a member of its board of directors.

References

1928 births
Living people
St. Louis Cardinals (football) owners
Sportspeople from Chicago
Georgetown University Law Center alumni